Darragh Lyons (born 15 May 1997) is an Irish hurler who plays for Waterford Championship club Dungarvan and at inter-county level with the Waterford senior hurling team. He usually lines out as a right wing-back.

Honours

Waterford
All-Ireland Under-21 Hurling Championship (1): 2016
Munster Under-21 Hurling Championship (1): 2016

References

1997 births
Living people
CIT hurlers
Dungarvan hurlers
Waterford inter-county hurlers